Calamagrostis ophitidis, the serpentine reedgrass, is a species of bunch grass in the family Poaceae.

It is endemic to California, where it grows in the serpentine soils of the mountain slopes north of the San Francisco Bay Area.

Description
It is a perennial grass forming clumps reaching heights between 60 centimeters and three feet/one meter. The inflorescence is a dense, thinly bushy array of rough, pale-colored spikelets.

References

External links

Jepson Manual Treatment for Calamagrostis ophitidis
USDA Plants Profile of Calamagrostis ophitidis
Calamagrostis ophitidis — U.C. Photo gallery

ophitidis
Endemic flora of California
Native grasses of California
Bunchgrasses of North America
Natural history of the California chaparral and woodlands
Natural history of the California Coast Ranges
Natural history of the San Francisco Bay Area